"Testify!" is a song recorded, co-written, and produced by British DJ Hifi Sean, featuring American singer and co-writer Crystal Waters, which was recorded in both London and Washington, D.C.. Taken from HiFi Sean's 2016 debut album "Ft.", the Gospel-themed single reached number one on Billboard's Dance Club Songs chart in its October 7, 2017 issue, giving Waters her eleventh chart topper, as well as the first number one for HiFi Sean.

Track listing
iTunes digital download
 "Testify!" (Sandy Rivera Main Mix) – 6:01
 "Testify!" (Rhythm Masters Vocal Mix) – 6:22
 "Testify!" (OPOLOPO Remix) – 7:24
 "Testify!" (Sandy Rivera Dub) – 5:59
 "Testify!" (Superchumbo Dub) – 5:27
 "Testify!" (Luke Solomon's Body Edit) – 5:33

Charts

Weekly charts

Year-end charts

References

External links
Official video at YouTube

2016 songs
2016 singles
2017 singles
Crystal Waters songs
Gospel songs
Electronic dance music songs